Campsiura nigripennis, is a species of dung beetle found in India, Sri Lanka, Myanmar, Malaysia, Indonesia, Thailand and Vietnam.

Biology
Adult females fly to elephant dung for oviposition and lay eggs on the dung. Larval stages then grow inside elephant dung by constructing ovoid cocoons. After the pupation, adults emerged after about a month. In addition, adults are also known to attack arboreal nests of Oecophylla smaragdina. In India, adults frequently nests of the wasp, Ropalidia montana, the first record that a cetoniid species observed to have an association with a social insect.

Subspecies
Four subspecies has been recorded: 

 Campsiura nigripennis cingalensis (Arrow, 1910)
 Campsiura nigripennis maculicollis (Westwood, 1874)
 Campsiura nigripennis nigripennis Schaum, 1841
 Campsiura nigripennis sumatrana Legrand, 2012

References 

Cetoniinae
Insects of Sri Lanka
Insects of India
Insects described in 1841